The Canton of Norrent-Fontes was one of the 14 cantons of the arrondissement of Béthune, in the Pas-de-Calais department, in northern France. It was disbanded following the French canton reorganisation which came into effect in March 2015. Its chief town was Norrent-Fontes. It had 19,753 inhabitants in 2012. It was disbanded following the French canton reorganisation which came into effect in March 2015.

The canton comprised 18 communes:

 Auchy-au-Bois
 Blessy
 Bourecq
 Estrée-Blanche
 Ham-en-Artois
 Isbergues
 Lambres
 Liettres
 Ligny-lès-Aire
 Linghem
 Mazinghem
 Norrent-Fontes
 Quernes
 Rely
 Rombly
 Saint-Hilaire-Cottes
 Westrehem
 Witternesse

References

Norrent-Fontes
2015 disestablishments in France
States and territories disestablished in 2015